Andrew Gower (born 1989) is an English actor.

Andrew Gower (or similar) may also refer to:

 Andrew Gower (programmer) (born 1978), co-founder of Jagex
 Andrew Gowers (born 1957), British newspaper editor
 Andrew Gowers (footballer) (born 1969), Australian rules footballer
 Andre Gower (born 1973), American actor